The 1900 St. Louis Cardinals season was the team's 19th season in St. Louis, Missouri and the 9th season in the National League. The Cardinals went 65–75 during the season and finished 5th in the National League.

Regular season

Season standings

Record vs. opponents

Notable transactions 
 May 22, 1900: Jack O'Connor was purchased from the Cardinals by the Pittsburgh Pirates for $2,000.

Roster

Player stats

Batting

Starters by position 
Note: Pos = Position; G = Games played; AB = At bats; H = Hits; Avg. = Batting average; HR = Home runs; RBI = Runs batted in

Other batters 
Note: G = Games played; AB = At bats; H = Hits; Avg. = Batting average; HR = Home runs; RBI = Runs batted in

Pitching

Starting pitchers 
Note: G = Games pitched; IP = Innings pitched; W = Wins; L = Losses; ERA = Earned run average; SO = Strikeouts

Other pitchers 
Note: G = Games pitched; IP = Innings pitched; W = Wins; L = Losses; ERA = Earned run average; SO = Strikeouts

References

External links
1900 St. Louis Cardinals at Baseball Reference
1900 St. Louis Cardinals team page at www.baseball-almanac.com

St. Louis Cardinals seasons
Saint Louis Cardinals season
St Louis